The Artsakh national football team, until 2017 known as Nagorno-Karabakh national football team, is the national representative of the Republic of Artsakh (Nagorno-Karabakh), which is internationally unrecognized. Consequently, it is not a member of FIFA or UEFA and is therefore not eligible to enter the World Cup or the European Championship.

History
On 17 September 2012 they became a provisional member of the N.F.-Board and a week later played their first competitive match away against Abkhazia. The following month they played the return match at home against Abkhazia. Their first competitive competition was the ConIFA World Football Cup which took place in Östersund, Sweden. The Association of Football Federations of Azerbaijan failed to stop their participating in the competition after contacting ConIFA. ConIFA refused to revoke their invitation and Artsakh finished 9th overall after losses to Ellan Vannin, Nice and wins against Darfur and Sapmi.

In 2019, Artsakh came back to CONIFA competitions by organising the 2019 CONIFA European Football Cup, where they finished in the fifth position.

International record

At CONIFA World Football Cup

At CONIFA European Football Cup

Current squad
The following 23 players were called up to the squad for the 2019 CONIFA European Football Cup.

Matches played

References

See also
 Republic of Artsakh
 Stepan Shahumyan Republican Stadium

CONIFA member associations
European N.F.-Board teams
European national and official selection-teams not affiliated to FIFA
Sport in the Republic of Artsakh